Mayflower Cemetery is a town-owned cemetery in Duxbury, in Plymouth County, Massachusetts. The first grave was of Stephen Russell in 1787 and the first engraved stone was of Ichabod Sampson in 1788. The Duxbury Crematory, also owned by the town, is located on the cemetery grounds.  The cemetery is also known as the "Old Cemetery at Unitarian Church Duxbury."

Notable burials

 Richard W. Day (1916–1978) – principal of Phillips Exeter Academy
 Rufus Hathaway (d. 1822) – physician and painter
 George Partridge (1740–1828) – delegate to the Continental Congress, U.S. Representative
 Cid Ricketts Sumner (1890–1970) – novelist
 Ruth Graves Wakefield (1903–1977) – baker, inventor of the chocolate chip cookie
 Jerry Williams (1923–2003) – American radio host

External links
 
 
  

Cemeteries in Plymouth County, Massachusetts
Duxbury, Massachusetts
Cemeteries established in the 1780s
1787 establishments in Massachusetts